WCUG (850 AM) was a radio station broadcasting a country music format. Formerly licensed to Cuthbert, Georgia, United States, the station was owned by Mullis Communications, Inc.

Mullis Communications returned WCUG's license to the Federal Communications Commission (FCC) on January 25, 2011, and it was cancelled by the FCC on February 7, 2011.

References

External links

CUG
Radio stations established in 1975
Radio stations disestablished in 2011
Defunct radio stations in the United States
1975 establishments in Georgia (U.S. state)
2011 disestablishments in Georgia (U.S. state)
CUG
CUG